Sutton Howgrave is a village in the Hambleton District of North Yorkshire, England. It is the only village in the civil parish of Sutton with Howgrave. The population of the parish was estimated at 70 in 2014.

Sutton Howgrave was mentioned in the Domesday Book (as Sudtone) and in the Middle Ages it was a manor in the parish of Kirklington in the North Riding of Yorkshire.  It remained a township of Kirklington until 1866, when it became a separate civil parish, now known as Sutton with Howgrave.

Despite its name, the parish of Sutton with Howgrave does not include all of Howgrave, which is a separate civil parish.

The civil parish of Sutton with Howgrave became part of Hambleton district in North Yorkshire in 1974. Since 1978 it has shared the grouped parish council of Kirklington with Sutton Howgrave with the parishes of Kirklington-cum-Upsland and Howgrave.

References 

Villages in North Yorkshire
Hambleton District